The 45th South American Swimming Championships were held from 16 to 19 March at the Parque Olímpico de la Juventud in Buenos Aires, Argentina.

Participating countries

*Invitational countries

Results

Men's events

Women's events

Mixed events

Medal standings

Team ranking

References

External links 
 Official website
 Results
 Results book

South American Swimming Championships
South American Swimming Championships
South American Swimming Championships
Swimming competitions in Argentina
International sports competitions in Buenos Aires
South American Swimming Championships
 Sports competitions in Buenos Aires